Edgeworthia (paper bush) is a genus of plants in the family Thymelaeaceae. When the genus was first described, it was published twice in the same year (1841), in two separate publications: ; and Denkschriften der Regensburgischen Botanischen Gesellschaft. The genus was named in honour of Michael Pakenham Edgeworth, an Irish-born botanist and official in the Bengal Civil Service, then stationed in India, and for his half-sister, writer Maria Edgeworth.

Trichotomous branching 
At least one member of the genus, Edgeworthia chrysantha, has the extremely unusual ability to branch trichotomously - the apical meristem forming the end of each stem splits into three sections at once. This trait is shared with no other known flowering plant.

Species
Species list from both GRIN and ThePlantList

References

Thymelaeoideae
Malvales genera